The Dubbeez was a Dutch reggae band from Amsterdam and Almere.

History
The band won the "Battle of the Bands" at Uitmarkt Festival in Amsterdam in September 2015.

In 2016 The Dubbeez participated at the Reggaeville's World Reggae Contest, being selected among the five finalists. They performed at the final night of the Ostróda Reggae Festival in Poland and won the competition.

The band released its first studio album Love, Peace & Dub on 26 January 2018. The same year they performed at Antilliaanse Feesten.

On 4 January 2019 the band published a post on their Facebook account stating «We've been locked up in the studio making new music. We can't wait to share it with you all». This was later revealed to be untrue, since the band split the next month as announced on the same page on 5 February 2019.

Members 
Joanne Tholel – lead vocals
Quincy Fleur – rap vocals
Millan van Wingerden – guitars
Bobby Sahiboe – keyboards
Olivia Davina Ramdat – bass
Earl Maddy – drums

Discography

Studio albums 
 Peace, Love & Dub (2018)

Extended plays 
 Dubby (2016)

Singles 
 "Rudebwoy" (2015)
 "Hangover" (2016)
 "Feelings" (2017)
 "Obsession" (2018)

References

External links 

Dutch reggae musical groups
Musical groups established in 2014
2014 establishments in the Netherlands
Musical groups from Flevoland
Musical groups from Amsterdam
People from Almere